Gouverneur Morris IV (1876–1953) was an American author of pulp novels and short stories during the early 20th century.

Biography
Gouverneur Morris IV was born in 1876 and was a great-grandson of American Founding Father Gouverneur Morris. He graduated from Yale University, where he wrote for campus humor magazine The Yale Record.

Publications

Morris wrote several novels. His numerous short stories were first published in magazines, notably Cosmopolitan, Collier's, The Saturday Evening Post, Metropolitan, The Smart Set, and Harper's Bazaar, and many were collected in book form.

Film and Music 

American composer Carolne Holme Walker (1863-1955) used Morris’ text for her song “Your Kiss.”

Several of his works were adapted into films, including The Penalty (1920) with Lon Chaney, Sr.

Other film adaptions of his novels include: 

The Jungle Princess (1936) with screenwriter Cyril Hume, starring Dorothy Lamour in her film debut
East of Java (1935) with screenwriter James Ashmore Creelman, starring Frank Albertson and Charles Bickford 
The Man Who Played God (1932), starring George Arliss and Bette Davis
The Man Who Played God (1922), starring George Arliss and Ann Forrest
The Ace of Hearts (1921) directed by Wallace Worsley and starring Lon Chaney, Sr.
A Tale of Two Worlds (1921), directed by Frank Lloyd and starring Wallace Beery
Behind the Door (1919), starring Wallace Beery

Partial bibliography
Tom Beauling (1901)
Aladdin O'Brien (1902)
The Pagan's Progress (1904)
Ellen and Mr. Man (1904)
The Footprint and Other Stories (1908)
Putting on the Screws (1909)
The Spread Eagle and Other Stories (1910)
The Voice in the Rice (1910)
Yellow Men and Gold (1911)
It, and Other Stories (1912)
If You Touch Them They Vanish (1913)
The Penalty (1913)
The Incandescent Lily and Other Stories (1914)
The Goddess (1915)
When My Ship Comes In (1915)
The Seven Darlings (1915)
We Three (1916)
His Daughter (1919)
The Wild Goose (1919)
Keeping the Peace (1924)
 Tiger Island (1934)

References

External links

 

1876 births
1953 deaths
Morris family (Morrisania and New Jersey)
American people of Dutch descent
American male novelists
20th-century American novelists
20th-century American male writers
People from Aiken, South Carolina
American people of Powhatan descent